Rosemary Ann Butler (born April 6, 1947) is an American singer. She began her career playing bass guitar and singing in an all-female band named the Ladybirds while attending Fullerton Union High School in Fullerton, California. The band appeared on several Los Angeles area television shows before opening for the Rolling Stones in 1964. She then joined all-female hard rock band Birtha, which released two albums for Dunhill Records. After they split in 1975, she became a popular back-up singer in the late 1970s and early 1980s. Her vocals were featured on Bonnie Raitt's album Sweet Forgiveness, on songs "Gamblin' Man", "Runaway", "Sweet Forgiveness" and "Two Lives". She was also featured in Bruce Springsteen, Tom Petty, and Jackson Browne's "Stay (Just A Little Bit Longer)" during Springsteen and The E Street Band's 1979 "No Nukes" shows at Madison Square Garden.

Butler has worked extensively as a back-up singer for Linda Ronstadt, James Taylor, Warren Zevon, Neil Young, Bonnie Raitt, Boz Scaggs, Nitty Gritty Dirt Band, Jackson Browne, and Rosanne Cash among others. She released a solo album, Rose, in 1983.

She achieved her greatest visibility and success as a solo artist in Japan in the early 1980s, contributing songs such as "Riding High" to the movie Dirty Hero (汚れた英雄) and "Children of the Light" (光の天使) to the anime film Harmagedon. She was also co-contractor of the 100-voice choir on Neil Young's album Living with War. She co-founded "The National In Choir", a Los Angeles-based volunteer holiday choir with singer-lyricist Deborah Pearl.

After 30 years, Butler's second solo album, You Just Watch Me, was released in 2013.

References

External links

 

1947 births
Living people
American rock bass guitarists
American vocal coaches
Women bass guitarists
Guitarists from California
Singers from California
20th-century American bass guitarists
20th-century American women singers
20th-century American women musicians
21st-century American women singers
21st-century American singers
20th-century American singers